is a Japanese footballer currently playing as a forward for Tegevajaro Miyazaki.

Career statistics

Club
.

Notes

References

1998 births
Living people
Association football people from Osaka Prefecture
Osaka University of Commerce alumni
Japanese footballers
Association football forwards
J3 League players
Tegevajaro Miyazaki players